For Heaven's Sake is a 1950 fantasy film starring Clifton Webb as an angel trying to save the marriage of a couple played by Joan Bennett and Robert Cummings. It was adapted from the play May We Come In? by Harry Segall.

Plot
Angels Charles and Arthur try to convince a young cherub named Item to stop waiting to be born to Lydia and Jeff Bolton, her parents who she has personally selected. The Boltons are too busy with their theater work to start a family and are also drifting apart, as Lydia wants to have a child but Jeff convinces her to put their careers first.

When Item proves adamant, Charles tries to help by taking human form as "Slim" Charles, a supposedly rich Montanan, and encountering the Boltons at a racetrack. Jeff sees a potential financial backer (an "angel" in theatrical slang) for his next play, so he asks his playwright Daphne Peters to try to convince Charles to invest in the production, not knowing that Charles does not have any money. Jeff's usual backer Tex Henry appears and draws cards with Charles to determine who will make the investment, and Tex wins.

Charles begins to enjoy human vices. When Daphne's former actor boyfriend Tony Clark returns for her, Charles punches him. Charles also starts playing modern music on his harp and drinking, but Arthur disapproves.

Charles has not completely forgotten his mission. He arranges a lavish party to celebrate the Boltons' eighth anniversary, but it does not work as planned. The Boltons decide to break up, and Charles is taken to the mental hospital, where he admits that he is an angel. When Lydia develops a sudden craving for peanuts, Jeff realizes that she is pregnant (with Item), and they reconcile.

Cast
 Clifton Webb as Charles / "Slim" Charles
 Joan Bennett as Lydia Bolton
 Robert Cummings as Jeff Bolton
 Edmund Gwenn as Arthur
 Joan Blondell as Daphne Peters
 Gigi Perreau as Item
 Jack La Rue as Tony Clark
 Harry von Zell as Tex Henry
 Tommy Rettig as Joe Blake
 Hal Baylor as an Expectant Father(uncredited)
 Whit Bissell as a Doctor(uncredited)

Production
The film was to have starred Anne Baxter, but she withdrew and Joan Bennett assumed the role. Filming began in June 1950.

Release
In a contemporary review, critic Bosley Crowther of The New York Times wrote: "Mr. Webb, need we say, is an actor with an urbane sense of the grotesque and a thoroughly cultivated talent for farcical mimicry. So his broad travesty of a rancher 'from God's country,' whose particular line is 'sheep' and whose weakness is wine and women, is very amusing to see. But we have to advise that the whimsies with which this picture begins and in which it dissolves at the climax are far on the sticky side—the sort of stuff that may seem poignant if you're a softie, but nauseous if you're not."

See also
 List of films about angels

References

External links
 
 
 
 

1950 films
American black-and-white films
Films scored by Alfred Newman
American films based on plays
Films directed by George Seaton
American romantic fantasy films
20th Century Fox films
1950 romantic drama films
American romantic drama films
1950s fantasy films
1950s romantic fantasy films
Films produced by William Perlberg
1950s English-language films
1950s American films